Ga-Mokobodi is a village in Ga-Matlala in the Blouberg Local Municipality of the Capricorn District Municipality of the Limpopo province of South Africa. It is located about 5 km northwest of Tibane.

Education 
Mošibi Mokobodi Primary School.
Selamodi Secondary School.

References 

Populated places in the Blouberg Local Municipality